Sally may refer to:

People
 Sally (name), a list of notable people with the name
 , French influencer and activist

Literature
 Sally, a detective novel by E.V. Cunningham (aka Howard Fast)
 "Sally" (short story),  by Isaac Asimov
 "Sally", a poem by Patti Smith from her book Seventh Heaven

Military
 Sally (military), an attack by the defenders of a town or fortress under siege against a besieging force
 Sally, the Allied reporting name for the Imperial Japanese Army's World War II Mitsubishi Ki-21 bomber

Music
 Sally (band), an indie-rock band from Chicago, Illinois
 "Sally" (Gogol Bordello song), 2005
 "Sally" (Gracie Fields song), first performed in the film Sally in Our Alley, 1931
 "Sally" (Hardwell song), 2015
 "Sally" (Kerbdog song), 1996
 "Sally" (Thundamentals song), 2017
 "Sally", a song by Anthony Phillips from Invisible Men, 1983
 "Sally", a song by Carmel, 1986
 "Sally", a song by Foxboro Hot Tubs from Stop Drop and Roll!!!, 2008
 "Sally", a song by Grand Funk Railroad from Born to Die, 1976
 "Sally", a song by Mike Oldfield from Platinum, 1979
 "Sally", a song by Sade from Diamond Life, 1984
 "Sally", a song by Sam Sparro from Sam Sparro, 2008
 "Sally", a song by Thundamentals, 2017
 "Sally", a song by Vasco Rossi, 1996
 "Sally", a song by Vaya Con Dios from Night Owls, 1990
 “Sally”, a song by Blink 182

Film, stage and television
 Sally (musical), a 1920 theatre musical
 Sally (1925 film) based on the musical
 Sally (1929 film) also based on the musical
 Sally (1957 TV series), an American situation comedy
 Sally (talk show), a talk show originally called The Sally Jessy Raphael Show
 Sally (2000 film), an American drama
 "Sally" (Flight of the Conchords), the pilot episode of the TV series Flight of the Conchords (2007)
 Sally (The Nightmare Before Christmas), a character in the film The Nightmare Before Christmas
 Sally (Peanuts), a Peanuts comic strip character
 Sally (South Park), a character in the animated TV series South Park

Businesses
 Sally Corporation, a manufacturer of dark rides and animatronics
 Sally Line, an Ålandian passenger shipping company and cruise line
 Rederi Ab Sally, Finnish shipping company

Other uses
 Sally (ship), several ships
 SALLY (microprocessor), a customised 6502 CPU chip used in some Atari computers and games consoles
 Axis Sally, the name given to female radio propaganda broadcasters for the Axis in World War II
 Hurricane Sally, a devastating category 2 hurricane that impacted Florida and the central gulf coast
 Viking Sally, a cruise ferry launched in 1980
 South Atlantic League (often informally called the "Sally League"), a former Minor League Baseball league in the United States
 The portion of a bell rope used in change ringing which has a covering; see Change ringing

See also
 
 
 "Sally Ann" as The Salvation Army, a Protestant Christian church
 Aunt Sally (disambiguation)
 List of storms named Sally
 Salley (disambiguation)

Feminine given names